Angel Clivilles is the stage name used by Louise Angel Sabater, a Latina dance music singer of Puerto Rican descent. She was born in the Bronx, New York, United States.

Music career
Louise "Angel" Mercado began her musical career in 1986 as a member of the freestyle girl group the Cover Girls. Mercado left the Cover Girls in 1990 to embark on a solo career. Angel's solo career never took off, so she had to fall back on using The Cover Girl name. Today, she tours using the name, 'Angel (The Original Cover Girl)'. She is married to La' Entertainment's founder and owner Latif Mercado, having divorced Carlos Clivillés, older brother of Robert of the group C + C Music Factory.

Discography

Albums
2000: Angel

Singles
1998: "Toro Mata"
1999: "One More Chance"
2000: "Show Me" - U.S. Dance #1

See also
List of artists who reached number one on the US Dance chart

References

External links
 Angel Mercado on Myspace
 The Cover Girls on Myspace
 The Cover Girls-related website

American women pop singers
American freestyle musicians
American house musicians
People from the Bronx
Living people
Year of birth missing (living people)
21st-century American women